Kukushka is a rural locality (a village) in Kochyovskoye Rural Settlement, Kochyovsky District, Perm Krai, Russia. The population was 195 as of 2010. There are 7 streets.

Geography 
Kukushka is located 20 km southeast of Kochyovo (the district's administrative centre) by road. Polozayka is the nearest rural locality.

References 

Rural localities in Kochyovsky District